Ella Jones is an American chromatographer, pastor, and politician who serves as the 12th mayor of Ferguson, Missouri. A former member of the Ferguson City Council, Jones is the first African-American and woman elected mayor of the city.

Education 
Jones earned a Bachelor of Arts degree in chemistry from the University of Missouri–St. Louis.

Career 
Prior to entering politics, Jones was a high pressure liquid chromatographer. She worked at the Washington University School of Medicine and KV Pharmaceutical before becoming a sales director with Mary Kay. In April 2015, Jones was the first African-American elected to the Ferguson City Council, where she represented the city's first ward. In February 2020, Jones was selected to serve on the United States Environmental Protection Agency Local Government Advisory Committee.

In the 2017 municipal election, Jones ran for mayor, receiving 42.77% of the vote. It was the city's first election after the shooting of Michael Brown and subsequent Ferguson unrest.

In the June 2, 2020 mayoral election, Jones defeated fellow council member Heather Robinett. Jones succeeded incumbent James Knowles III, a Republican who was unable to seek re-election due to term limits. On June 17, 2020, Jones was sworn in as the first black and female mayor of Ferguson.

She is also a pastor in the African Methodist Episcopal Church.

Electoral history

Personal life 
Jones moved to Ferguson, Missouri with her husband, Tim. Tim Jones died in 2013. Jones has one daughter.

References

External links 
 Ella Jones for Mayor campaign website
 Ella Jones biography on the City of Ferguson, Missouri website

Missouri Democrats
University of Missouri–St. Louis alumni
African-American mayors in Missouri
Women mayors of places in Missouri
Politicians from St. Louis County, Missouri
Chromatography
Year of birth missing (living people)
Living people